The Dancing Heart is a 1953 West German historical musical comedy film directed by Wolfgang Liebeneiner and starring Gertrud Kückelmann, Gunnar Möller, and Wilfried Seyferth.

It was made at the Tempelhof Studios in Berlin. The film was shot using Agfacolor. The film's sets were designed by the art directors Emil Hasler and Walter Kutz.

Plot

Cast

References

Bibliography

External links 
 

1953 films
1953 musical comedy films
1950s historical comedy films
German historical comedy films
German musical comedy films
West German films
1950s German-language films
Films directed by Wolfgang Liebeneiner
Films set in the 19th century
Films shot at Tempelhof Studios
1950s historical musical films
German historical musical films
1950s German films